Shawn Quinn is an American bridge player.

Bridge accomplishments

Wins

 North American Bridge Championships (18)
 Smith Life Master Women's Pairs (5) 1999, 2000, 2001, 2002, 2009 
 Machlin Women's Swiss Teams (5) 1997, 1999, 2003, 2006, 2010 
 Wagar Women's Knockout Teams (4) 1996, 1997, 2006, 2012 
 Keohane North American Swiss Teams (1) 2005 
 Sternberg Women's Board-a-Match Teams (3) 1998, 2000, 2002

Runners-up

 North American Bridge Championships
 Whitehead Women's Pairs (1) 1999 
 Machlin Women's Swiss Teams (2) 2004, 2012 
 Wagar Women's Knockout Teams (3) 2000, 2009, 2011 
 Sternberg Women's Board-a-Match Teams (2) 1997, 2003

References

External links
 

American contract bridge players
Living people
Year of birth missing (living people)
Place of birth missing (living people)